Anthony Francis Stacchi (born July 27, 1964) is an American animator, effects animator, storyboard artist, screenwriter, and film director.

Stacchi graduated from California Institute of the Arts with a BFA in Film in 1986. His student films screened at the 1987 Annecy and Hiroshima Animated Film Festivals. He then went on to be an Animator and Commercial Director at San Francisco's Colossal Pictures and an effects animator at Industrial Light and Magic on Back to the Future 2 and 3, Hook, The Rocketeer and Ghost, and Henry Selick's James and the Giant Peach. He was a storyboard artist for Antz, Spirit: Stallion of the Cimarron, Curious George, Astro Boy, Missing Link, and Del Toro's Pinocchio and was the head of story for ILM's aborted computer animated feature Frankenstein, and a short film, Work in Progress.

He made his directorial debut as co-director of Sony Pictures Animation's first film Open Season. He Directed the 3D Stop-Motion animated feature film The Boxtrolls, at Laika. It was released in 2014.

Stacchi currently serves as director for The Monkey King, a Netflix original animated film which is scheduled for a 2023 release.

Filmography

References

External links

Living people
1961 births
American animators
American film directors
American male screenwriters
American animated film directors
California Institute of the Arts alumni
Laika (company) people
American storyboard artists
Sony Pictures Animation people